This is a continued list of games for the Sony PlayStation 2 video game system. Title names may be different for each region due to the first language spoken.

Games list (L–Z)
There are currently  games across both this page (L to Z) and the remainder of the list from A to K.

Applications

Bundles

See also
 List of PlayStation 2 games (A–K)
 List of PlayStation games (A–L)
 List of PlayStation games (M–Z)
 List of PlayStation games incompatible with PlayStation 2
 List of PlayStation 2 online games
 List of best-selling PlayStation 2 video games
 List of PlayStation 2 Classics for PlayStation 3
 List of PlayStation 2 games for PlayStation 4

References

External links

2

PlayStation 2 (L-Z)